Issah Gabriel Ahmed or Issah Gabarel Ahmad (born 24 May 1982) is a Ghanaian former professional footballer who played as a defender.

Club career
Ahmed signed a new contract with Randers FC in the end of July 2008.

International career
Ahmed was a member of the Ghana national team. He was called up to the 2006 World Cup as one of three Ghana-based players at the 2006 World Cup.

References

External links
 Fifa 2006 World Cup Profile
 Official Danish Superliga stats
 
 

1982 births
Living people
Association football defenders
Ghanaian footballers
Ghana international footballers
2006 Africa Cup of Nations players
2006 FIFA World Cup players
Danish Superliga players
Dawu Youngstars players
Accra Great Olympics F.C. players
Asante Kotoko S.C. players
Randers FC players
Ghanaian expatriate footballers
Ghanaian expatriate sportspeople in Denmark
Expatriate men's footballers in Denmark